East Palmerston is a rural locality in the Cassowary Coast Region, Queensland, Australia. In the  East Palmerston had a population of 173 people.

East Palmerston is a prominent banana farming community. It is home to many large farms such as LMB Farms.

Geography 
The Palmerston Highway passes from north-east to south-west through the locality.

History 
The locality is presumably so named because it is to the east of neighbouring Palmerston, which in turn is believed to be named after explorer and prospector, Christie Palmerston.

About July 1933 the land of East Palmerston was surveyed to enable 10,400 acres be offered for selection in 55 lots. By September 1938, a large population was living in the area with some farms sufficiently established to supply cream to the Millaa Millaa butter factory.

The Palmerston East State School (sometimes called East Palmerston State School) opened on 19 April 1938. It closed on 26 April 2012. It was located at 2068 Palmerston Highway East. The school's website was archived.

On 25 April (Anzac Day) 2008, a memorial was unveiled at Palmerston East State School at 2068 Palmerston Highway commemorating the Australian servicemen and women who served during wars and other conflicts.

In the  East Palmerston had a population of 173 people.

Community groups 
The East Palmerston branch of the Queensland Country Women's Association meets at the Currajah Hotel, Grima Street, Wangan.

References

Further reading 
 
 

Cassowary Coast Region
Localities in Queensland